Youngtown Barracks is an Australian Defence Force barracks in central Launceston, Tasmania.

Youngtown Barracks is home to the following units:

 A Coy, 12th/40th Battalion, Royal Tasmania Regiment
 67 Regional Cadet Unit, Army Cadet Unit

References

Military installations in Tasmania
Barracks in Australia